Lindenow may refer to:

Places
 Lindenow, Victoria, a town in Australia

People
 Lindenov family, Danish noble family
 Godske Lindenov, a Danish naval officer and Arctic explorer who led one of Christian IV's expeditions to Greenland